Ghost Style (born Brandon Ho 1973 in Montreal, Quebec, Canada) is a Canadian rapper, producer and actor based in Hong Kong. He is credited with releasing the first English language rap album in Hong Kong (Ghost Style's Alias, 2002). He followed up with two other English rap albums (Supathugz' How Deep Is Yo Love in 2004 and Ghost Style's Message Is Complete, 2005).

Career
Ghost Style started his career as the frontman for a Hong Kong local band called "Site Access." They are known for bringing out an original sound Alternative Groove Funk. The band decided to take a break in 2003 and that's when Ghost Style started his solo career.

His first major work as rapper/producer was for Cantopop star Eason Chan. In 2001, Ghost Style was invited to remix one of Chan's songs for a remix project Mixed Up. At the same time Ghost Style met international dance music producer Dan F (Disuye). At that time Dan F was creating breakbeat tracks and both collaborated on the remix. Dan F who won two Breakbeat Awards in the UK, would be Ghost Style's collaborator on 2002 release Alias and Ghost Style's 2005 release Message Is Complete. Ghost Style was the voice talent in the 2005 movie soundtrack release Initial D.

Ghost Style had formed a project label called Rebel Studio (now defunct). The producer is giving back by supporting local talents and other urban events in Hong Kong. In Summer 2006, while out on the weekend Ghost Style bumped into Hong Kong actor/celebrity Conroy Chan. Conroy suggested to form a group consisting of six members; Eddie Chung (drum music), Brian Siswojo (designer for street fashion label Know1edge, 8five2 Shop owner), Kit & Phat (from Hong Kong legendary crew LMF), Ghost Style and himself. GS thought this would be a great collaboration and "24HERBS" was formed.

Since 2006, Ghost Style has worked with 24Herbs. Ghost Style is both a rapper and one of the producers in the crew. Their album released on 24 January 2008 at the Causeway Bay Delay No Mall Hong Kong. Ghost Style helped pen hits  such as "Superstar", "Jiu Jo" and "Chillin & Blazin". 24Herbs won an award for Hong Kong best new song on January 1, 2009. "Jiu Jo" was also featured on Nike Skateboard website.

Discography

Albums 
Site Access Slow Jam LP, 2000
Ghost Style Alias LP, 2002
Site Access Funk Fu LP, 2003
Supathugz How Deep Is Yo Love LP, 2003
Supathugz So Hot It Hertz LP, 2004
Ghost Style Message Is Complete LP, 2005
LY.S O1 Mash up live recording The Darlings + Ghost Style LP, 2007
24HERBS 24HERBS Double-Disc LP, 2008
Ghost Style "Quantum Beats and Alien Bloodlines" instrumental, 2010
24HERBS Bring it On CD+DVD, 2011
Ghost Style GeeStyles Collabo EP Digital Download, 2011

Productions
CR2 Tribute to Beyond Paradise, 1999
Videodrome Make You Die Slowly, 2001
MCB Music for Your Beautiful Boy In the Land of The Ice and Snow, 2001
Alok's Wahoo! Future Moon Slay, 2002
FAMA F.A.M.A., 2002
MC Su  Trip , 2004
Alok's 31 Minutes to Midnight Dead Poet's Society, 2005
5th Element Compilation What's Going On, 2005
Jan Lamb's 30something First Romance, 2005
MC Su  Pills & Permit , 2006
Jan Lamb's 30something World is Strange, 2008
24Herbs Chillin' & Blazin''', 2008
24Herbs "Jiu Jo", 2008
24Herbs "Crazy Night", 2008
24Herbs "Keepin' It Raw", 2008
Ghost Style feat. Maggie Hou Love Affair, 2010
Ghost Style X Green Robot Up Down Girl, 2010
Ghost Style x Green Robot "Giant F*ckin' Robot" 2011
Ghost Style x DJ Jay Weezy "The Brighter Side", 2011
Ghost Style "Beat Bang Baby", 2011
24Herbs "Fashionista", 2011
24Herbs "Rock As One", 2011
24Herbs "Perfect", 2011
24Herbs "Hu Ge", 2011
Edmond Leung "Big Man" ft. 24Herbs, 2012

Feature
Alok "Future Moon Slay" ft. Ghost Style, 2002
Alok "Dead Poet’s Society" ft. Ghost Style, 2005
Paul Wong "Let's Fight" ft. Ghost Style, 2009
Sammi Cheng 鄭秀文 "Forgiveness (Eng. Version)" ft. 24Herbs' Ghost Style, Drunk, JBS, 2009
85up2 Mixtape ""So Far To Go"" ft. Ghost Style, 2009
24Herbs Bring It On ""Chillax"" ft. Ghost Style, Soft Lipa 蛋堡, 2010
24Herbs Bring It On ""Why Can't U"" ft. Ghost Style, 2010
Niki Chow - Zui Hou Dao Shu featuring Ghost Style, 2010
Khalil Fong "张永成 (Cheung Wing Sing)" ft. Ghost Style, 2011
Paul Wong "這個荒唐無聊盲目的世界" ft. Ghost Style, Phat, Kit, JBS, 2012
MastaMic Justice Is What IRap For Mixtape ""仇富不仁(Justice Remix)"" ft. Ghost Style, 肥寶, Critical, 鳥人, BIG Sammy, 2012
My City - Ghost Style ft. Liz Ho and Joyce Yung, 2012
《La La La》Robynn & Kendy ft. Ghost Style, 2013
Sammi Cheng 鄭秀文 "戰勝自己" ft. 24Herbs' Ghost Style, Phat, Kit, 2014
Chung Brothers "Mammon" ft. Ghost Style, Kwokkin 2014
Aga "3am" ft. Ghost Style 2017

Remixes
 Eason Chan Mixed Up (track 2)'', 2001
 inLove "Realm (Ghost Style remix)", 2005
 Oliver "Scent of U", 2007
 KZ ""90年代曲"" (mixing engineer), 2010
 Tommy Grooves "Room Service" (mixing engineer), 2012

Soundtrack
Initial D The Movie Soundtrack, 2005
Girl$ 囡囡(unreleased soundtrack), 2010

References

Hong Kong male rappers
Hong Kong male singers
Hong Kong hip hop
English-language singers from Hong Kong
Living people
1973 births
Hong Kong people of Canadian descent
Canadian hip hop singers